Father Mercredi Community High School is a Roman Catholic high school in Fort McMurray, Alberta, Canada. It became the first Catholic high school in the city of Fort McMurray and is operated by the Fort McMurray Catholic School District.

History
The school was named after Father Patrick Mercredi, the second First Nations priest in the Province of Alberta.

Administration
Principal: Lisa Miller
Vice-Principal: Jamie MacNeil (Gr 7 and 11)
Vice-Principal: Kirsten McConnell (Gr 9 and 10)
Vice-Principal: Jana Slaney ( Gr 8 and 12)

External links
  Father Mercredi High School Website

Educational institutions established in 1982
High schools in Alberta
Catholic secondary schools in Alberta
Buildings and structures in Fort McMurray
1982 establishments in Alberta